Jeff Adrien (born February 10, 1986) is an American professional basketball player for San Lorenzo de Almagro of the Liga Nacional de Básquet, Argentina. He formerly served as captain for the University of Connecticut Huskies, where he played as a power forward.

High school career
Adrien attended Brookline High School in Brookline, Massachusetts. He rose to the varsity level as a sophomore on Brookline's state finalist team that year.  As a senior, Adrien's team again reached the state championship.  After his graduation (2004), Adrien attended Brewster Academy in Wolfeboro for a postgraduate year, playing in the Amateur Athletic Union, before entering the University of Connecticut on a full scholarship.

College career
Adrien played power forward for the University of Connecticut Huskies.  In the 2007–2008 NCAA season, Adrien was named to the 2008 First Team All-Big East Conference, leading the team in points (14.8 ppg) and rebounds (9.7 rpg). As team captain in the 2008–2009 NCAA men's basketball season, Adrien averaged 13.7 ppg, and 10 rebounds per game, constituting a rare double-double average.  In 2009, The Huskies made it to the Final Four of the 2009 NCAA Men's Division I Basketball Championship, before losing to the Michigan State Spartans.  Adrien finished his college career with over 1,600 points and 1,100 rebounds.

As for style of play, Adrien said in an interview that he feels the best attributes that he brings to the game are his "leadership, rebounding, toughness, and the ability to score over taller guys". Adrien indeed demonstrated potential as a rebounder over taller players in the NBA pre-draft measurements; despite measuring shorter than average for a power forward for the NBA draft at 6'6.5" with shoes on, Adrien's wingspan measures an outstanding 7'2" and he weighed in at a formidable 236 lbs.

Professional career

2009–10 season
Adrien was not selected in the 2009 NBA draft, but later signed with Spanish league's Leite Río Breogán in Lugo, Galicia.

In 2009, Adrien accepted an invite to play on a team in the Orlando Pro Summer League. The team was run jointly by both the New Jersey Nets and the Philadelphia 76ers.  He also played for the Memphis Grizzlies in the Vegas Summer League.  On the Grizzlies team, playing alongside fellow Connecticut alumni Marcus Williams, Rudy Gay and Hasheem Thabeet, he led the team in rebounding.

2010–11 season

Adrien played for the Orlando Magic in the Orlando Pro Summer League in 2010.

On August 24, 2010, Adrien was invited to the Golden State Warriors training camp. On October 10, 2010, Adrien scored 11 points and grabbed 15 rebounds in 22 minutes in a preseason game against the Sacramento Kings He made the Warriors' final roster, but was waived in December 2010 to make room for Acie Law.

On December 17, 2010, Adrien signed with the Erie BayHawks. He was traded to the Rio Grande Valley Vipers two weeks later for Garrett Temple.

On February 24, 2011, Adrien re-signed with the Golden State Warriors following a trade that allowed roster space for him.

On June 30, 2011, Adrien was waived by the Golden State Warriors.

2011–12 season
In July 2011 he signed a one-year contract with Benetton Treviso in Italy with an out clause to return to the NBA when the 2011 NBA lockout ended.

On December 21, 2011, Adrien signed with the Houston Rockets, where he was reunited with his former University of Connecticut teammate Hasheem Thabeet. He was waived on February 8, 2012.

2012–13 season

In October 2012, Adrien was acquired by the Rio Grande Valley Vipers.

On December 9, 2012, he was called up to play with the Charlotte Bobcats, where he was again reunited with a former University of Connecticut teammate in Kemba Walker. On January 8, 2013 the Bobcats guaranteed Adrien's contract for the remainder of the season.

2013–14 season
On February 20, 2014, Adrien was traded to the Milwaukee Bucks along with Ramon Sessions in exchange for Gary Neal and Luke Ridnour.

2014–15 season
On July 19, 2014, Adrien signed with the Houston Rockets, returning for a second stint. However, he was later waived by the Rockets on October 27, 2014.

On November 29, 2014, Adrien signed with the Minnesota Timberwolves to help the team deal with numerous injuries. Minnesota had to use an NBA hardship exemption in order to sign him as he made their roster stand at 16, one over the allowed limited of 15. On January 7, 2015, he was waived by the Timberwolves after appearing in 17 games.

On January 19, 2015, Adrien signed with the Guangdong Southern Tigers of the Chinese Basketball Association. Prior to Game 3 of Guangdong's semi-final match-up against the Beijing Ducks, Adrien was deactivated in order to open up a roster spot for Emmanuel Mudiay who returned from injury.

2015–16 season
On September 23, 2015, Adrien signed with the New Orleans Pelicans. However, he was later waived by the Pelicans on October 24 after appearing in three preseason games.

2016–17 season
On August 22, 2016, Adrien signed with Bnei Herzliya of the Israeli Premier League. During his season with the club, he was selected to the Israeli League All-Star game and helped the club reach the FIBA Europe Cup second round. However, despite their outstanding regular season with 76% home game victories, the team who ended the league at the fifth place didn't manage to win in the play-offs.

2017–18 season
On August 24, 2017, Adrien signed a two-year contract extension with Bnei Herzliya. On October 18, 2017, Adrien recorded a double-double of 26 points and 15 rebounds, shooting 12-of-15 from the field, in a 93–74 win over Alba Fehérvár. He was subsequently named FIBA Europe Cup Round 1 Top Performer. On March 29, 2018, Adrien was named Israeli League Player of the Month for games played in March. On April 8, 2018, Adrien recorded a career-high 31 points, shooting 10-of-17 from the field, along with 10 rebounds and 2 steals in an  86–78 win over Hapoel Jerusalem. Adrien finished his second season with Herzliya as the Israeli League fifth-leading scorer with 17.2 points per game, third in rebounds with 8.8 per game and third in efficiency rating with 21.2 per game.

2018–19 season
On July 3, 2018, Adrien signed a three-year contract extension with Bnei Herzliya. On March 7, 2019, Adrien recorded a season-high 25 points, shooting 9-of-14 from the field, along with 12 rebounds and four assists in an 89–90 loss to Hapoel Gilboa Galil. That season,  Bnei Herzliya have finished the season in the last place out of 12 teams and was relegated to the Israeli National League (the second-tier league in Israel).

2019–20 season
On August 28, 2019, Adrien signed with Ironi Nahariya for the 2019–20 season. In 14 games played for Nahariya, he averaged 10.9 and 6.4 rebounds per game. On January 7, 2020, he parted ways with Nahariya.

On February 22, 2020, he signed with Al-Ittihad Jeddah of the Saudi Premier League.

NBA career statistics

Regular season

|-
| style="text-align:left;"| 
| style="text-align:left;"| Golden State
| 23 || 0 || 8.5 || .426 || – || .579 || 2.5 || .4 || .2 || .2 || 2.5
|-
| style="text-align:left;"| 
| style="text-align:left;"| Houston
| 8 || 0 || 7.9 || .438 || – || .583 || 2.8 || .1 || .0 || .3 || 2.6
|-
| style="text-align:left;"| 
| style="text-align:left;"| Charlotte
| 52 || 5 || 13.7 || .429 || .000 || .650 || 3.8 || .7 || .3 || .5 || 4.0
|-
| style="text-align:left;"| 
| style="text-align:left;"| Charlotte
| 25 || 0 || 10.2 || .550 || – || .520 || 3.5 || .3 || .3 || .6 || 2.3
|-
| style="text-align:left;"| 
| style="text-align:left;"| Milwaukee
| 28 || 12 || 25.2 || .515 || – || .670 || 7.8 || 1.1 || .6 || .8 || 10.9
|-
| style="text-align:left;"| 
| style="text-align:left;"| Minnesota
| 17 || 0 || 12.6 || .432 || – || .579 || 4.5 || .9 || .2 || .5 || 3.5
|- class="sortbottom"
| style="text-align:center;" colspan="2"| Career
| 153 || 17 || 14.0 || .474 || .000 || .628 || 4.3 || .7 || .3 || .5 || 4.6

Personal life
Adrien is of Haitian descent.

References

External links
NBA.com profile 
FIBA.com profile
RealGM profile

1986 births
Living people
American expatriate basketball people in China
American expatriate basketball people in Israel
American expatriate basketball people in Italy
American expatriate basketball people in Russia
American expatriate basketball people in Saudi Arabia
American expatriate basketball people in Spain
American men's basketball players
American sportspeople of Haitian descent
Basketball players from Massachusetts
BC Khimki players
Bnei Hertzeliya basketball players
Brewster Academy alumni
Brookline High School alumni
CB Breogán players
Centers (basketball)
Charlotte Bobcats players
Erie BayHawks (2008–2017) players
Golden State Warriors players
Guangdong Southern Tigers players
Houston Rockets players
Ironi Nahariya players
Milwaukee Bucks players
Minnesota Timberwolves players
Pallacanestro Treviso players
Sportspeople from Brookline, Massachusetts
Power forwards (basketball)
Rio Grande Valley Vipers players
UConn Huskies men's basketball players
Undrafted National Basketball Association players